TalkTalk Telecom Group Plc v Office of Communications [2013] EWCA Civ 1318 is an EU law case relevant for UK enterprise law, concerning telecommunications.

Facts
TalkTalk claimed that charge controls should be imposed upon BT. In 2010, Ofcom reviewed competition in the wholesale broadband market. BT was the main provider. Before Ofcom published its Market Review Determination, TalkTalk said it would install its own broadband equipment in 700 local exchanges belonging to BT, as yet unspecified. As they were unknown, Ofcom ignored them in defining ‘Market 1’ and said even if TalkTalk deployed its plans, BT would still have a market share of at least 70-80%. This led Ofcom to say BT had significant market power in ‘Market 1’ and imposed a charge control, published in July 2011. By then, TalkTalk had completed unbundling, setting up in 17 exchanges in Market 1. Under CA 2003 s 86, Ofcom concluded there was no material change in Market 1, and BT’s market share would stay above 70%.

Judgment
The Court of Appeal held by a majority that Ofcom’s determination was correct and charge controls under CA 2003 section 86 could remain. McFarlane LJ and Sir Timothy Lloyd held that, though the circumstances had changed, it could not be seen as a material change under CA 2003 s 86. If forecasts of change had not been falsified to a material extent, there was no material change. The actual changes were within the scope of Ofcom’s predictions. Sir Bernard Rix dissented, arguing Ofcom substituted a new ‘Market 1’ definition, relating solely to ‘exchanges where only BT is present’, and should make a fresh Market Review Determination.

Sir Timothy Lloyd said the following.

See also

United Kingdom enterprise law
EU law

Notes

References

United Kingdom enterprise case law